Yawhen Lashankow (born 2 January 1979 in Minsk) is a Belarusian professional football coach and former player. As of 2017, he works as youth team coach at BATE Borisov .

Honours
BATE Borisov
Belarusian Premier League champion: 1999, 2002

External links

1979 births
Living people
Belarusian footballers
Belarus international footballers
Belarusian expatriate footballers
Expatriate footballers in Ukraine
Belarusian expatriate sportspeople in Ukraine
Ukrainian Premier League players
FC BATE Borisov players
FC Chornomorets Odesa players
FC Kharkiv players
FC Granit Mikashevichi players
FC Minsk players
FC Belshina Bobruisk players
FC Torpedo-BelAZ Zhodino players
FC Slutsk players
FC Baranovichi players
Association football midfielders
Footballers from Minsk